Gordon Gale Crean (born 29 April 1914 in Toronto; died 10 May 1976 in London) was a Canadian Diplomat. He graduated from the University of Toronto in 1937 where he was a Member of Alpha Delta Phi. He served as the ambassador to Italy, to Yugoslavia and to West Germany from 1970 to 1975. His son is publisher and editor Patrick Crean.

References 

People from Toronto
1914 births
1976 deaths
Ambassadors of Canada to Italy
Ambassadors of Canada to West Germany
Ambassadors of Canada to Yugoslavia